Arthur H. Behm (born March 25, 1932) is a North Dakota Democratic-NPL Party member of the North Dakota Senate, representing the 19th district from 2007 to 2011.  He lost re-election to Republican Gerald Uglem in 2010.

Political experience
Art Behm has had the following political experience:
Candidate, North Dakota State Senate, District 19, 2010
Senator, North Dakota State Senate, 2006–2010

Caucuses/non-legislative committees
Art Behm has been a member of the following committees:
Chair, McKenna Farmers Elevator Board

Professional experience
Art Behm has had the following professional experience:
United States Army, 1952–1954
Dairy Farmer

Organizations
Art Behm has been a member of the following organizations:
Elder, Saint Andrew Lutheran Church, 1959–present
President, Farmer Elev. MCana North Dakota, 1985–1999
Farm Credit Service
Saint Andrews Lutheran Church

External links
North Dakota State Legislature – Senator Art Behm official ND Senate website
Project Vote Smart – Senator Arthur H. Behm (ND) profile
Follow the Money – Art Behm
2006 campaign contributions
North Dakota Democratic-NPL Party – Senator Arthur H. Behm profile

References

North Dakota state senators
1932 births
Living people